Nightclub School Hospital, or Any Other Side, is a 2012 Chinese horror film.

Plot
Are the six people living in their dreaming stories? Or are they only characters in Dean's comic? Are there any boundaries between reality and fantasy? Who is the dominator of the stories?

Cast
Chrissie Chau
Van Fan
Qi Yuwu
Deng Jiajia
Yida Huang

References

External links

2012 directorial debut films
2012 films
2012 horror films
Chinese horror films